Peter Ford may refer to:

Peter Ford (footballer) (1933–2020), English footballer
Peter Ford (artist) (born 1937), English artist
Peter Ford (actor) (born 1945), son of actor Glenn Ford
Peter Ford (diplomat) (born 1947), retired British ambassador to Bahrain and Syria, now lobbyist
Peter Shann Ford (born 1950), Australian television news anchor
Peter Ford (entertainment reporter), Australian entertainment reporter
Peter Ford (Gaelic footballer) (born 1962), Irish retired sportsperson
Peter Ford (transport administrator) (born 1938), former chairman of London Transport
Peter Ford, better known as Baby Ford, British electronic music producer